James Wayne may refer to:

 James Moore Wayne (1790–1867), U.S. Supreme Court Justice and U.S. Representative
SS James M. Wayne, a Liberty ship
 James Wayne (R&B musician) (1920–1978), American rhythm and blues musician who also recorded as James Waynes and "Wild Willie" Wayne
 Jimmy Wayne (born 1972), American country musician
 Jimmy Wayne (album)
 Jim Wayne, member of the Kentucky House of Representatives